Naftovyk Stadium is a multi-use stadium in Okhtyrka, Ukraine.  It is currently used mostly for football matches, and is the home of FC Naftovyk-Ukrnafta Okhtyrka. The stadium holds 5,256 people.

References

Football venues in Ukraine
Buildings and structures in Sumy Oblast
Sports venues in Sumy Oblast